Transcend is the first full-length studio album by Canadian singer/songwriter Carole Pope.  The album was re-issued 1 January 2007 on True North Records.

Track listing 
 "Transcend" 4:49
 
 "Love Strikes Hard" 3:31
 
 "World of One" 4:03
 
 "Dream6" 3:22
 
 "Seduction" 4:00
 
 "Edible Flower" 3:25
 
 "All Touch/No Contact" 3:37
 
 "Shadows" 3:34
 
 "Americana" 3:54

Personnel
Performing:
Ky Anto - Bass
Alain Johannes - Bass, Drums, Guitar, Keyboards, 
Nick Kirgo - Guitar
Chris McNeil - Drums
Carole Pope - Composer, Drums, Guitar, Vocals
Tim Welch - Bass, Composer, Guitar,

Production:
John Capek - Composer
James Grimes - Design, Layout Design
Alain Johannes - Mixing, Producer
Craig McConnell - Engineer, Mixing
Carole Pope - Producer
Rob Sanzo - Engineer
Tim Welch - Instrumentation
John Whynot - Mixing

References
Citations

2004 debut albums
Carole Pope albums
True North Records albums